Subbekasha is a monotypic genus of North American sheet weavers containing the single species, Subbekasha flabellifera. It was first described by Alfred Frank Millidge in 1984, and has only been found in Canada.

See also
 List of Linyphiidae species (Q–Z)

References

Linyphiidae
Monotypic Araneomorphae genera
Spiders of North America